The 2010 Speedway Grand Prix was the 65th edition of the official World Championship and the 16th season of the Speedway Grand Prix era, deciding the FIM Speedway World Championship. It was the tenth series under the promotion of Benfield Sports International, an IMG company. The series began on 24 April in Leszno and finished on 9 October in Bydgoszcz.

The only rider to win more than one round, Tomasz Gollob claimed his first Speedway Grand Prix title after over a decade in the sport. Jarosław Hampel completed a Polish 1–2, claiming his first SGP win in Denmark ahead of Gollob. Reigning champion Jason Crump finished third in the standings; the tenth successive season in which Crump finished in the top three places.

Qualification 
For the 2010 season there was 15 permanent riders, joined at each Grand Prix by one wild card and two track reserves.

2009 Grand Prix 

The top eight riders from the 2009 championship qualified as of right:

  (1) Jason Crump
  (2) Tomasz Gollob
  (3) Emil Sayfutdinov
  (4) Greg Hancock
  (5) Andreas Jonsson
  (6) Nicki Pedersen
  (7) Rune Holta
  (8) Kenneth Bjerre

Grand Prix Challenge 

The top eight riders from the 2009 championship were joined by three riders who qualified via the Grand Prix Challenge.

  (11) Magnus Zetterström
  (12) Chris Holder
  (13) Jarosław Hampel

Nominations 

The final four riders were nominated by series promoters, Benfield Sports International, following the completion of the 2009 season. Riders were nominated after the season ended on October 13, 2009.

  (9) Fredrik Lindgren (9th placed in 2009 Grand Prix and 4th in Grand Prix Challenge)
  (10) Hans N. Andersen (10th placed in 2009 Grand Prix)
  (14) Chris Harris (14th placed in 2009 Grand Prix and 5th in Grand Prix Challenge)
  (15) Tai Woffinden

Qualified Substitutes 

  (19) Piotr Protasiewicz
  (20) Davey Watt
  (21) Martin Smolinski
  (22) Adrian Miedziński
  (23) Grzegorz Walasek
  (24) Lukáš Dryml

Calendar

Classification

See also 
 motorcycle speedway

References

External links 
 SpeedwayWorld.tv – SGP news

 
2010
World Individual